Pardeep Mor (born 3 June 1992 in Narwana, Haryana)  is an Indian professional field hockey player.
He usually plays in the Defender position.

Achievements
Selected as a Team member for Rio Olympics. Pardeep Mor was bought by Kalinga Lancers for $37,000 in the Hockey India League Auction 2015.
He has 16 international caps and 0 goals.
Pardeep Mor is a part of SAI Sonepat.

References

External links

Living people
1992 births
People from Jind district
Indian male field hockey players
Field hockey players from Haryana